Nukunonu is the largest atoll within Tokelau, a dependency of New Zealand, in the south Pacific Ocean. Motuhaga is the only islet that has inhabitants. It  has an estimated population of 448.

History

The first European vessel known to have come upon Nukunonu was the Royal Navy ship , in 1791, whose captain, Edward Edwards, named Duke of Clarence Island in honor of 
Prince William, Duke of Clarence and St Andrews (1765-1837), the third son of King George III and later king himself, as William IV. During the early 19th century, Nukunonu's inhabitants were converted to Roman Catholicism by Samoan missionaries.

Between 1856 and 1979, the United States claimed that it held sovereignty over the island and the other Tokelauan atolls. In 1979, the U.S. conceded that Tokelau was under New Zealand sovereignty, and a maritime boundary between Tokelau and American Samoa was established by the Treaty of Tokehega.

Demography

The main settlement on the atoll is located on Nukunonu Island at the southwestern edge of the lagoon with a concrete bridge joining the two areas of settlement. The island's residents depend upon coconuts, pandanus, and marine life for subsistence. Fresh water is scarce; concrete water tanks are incorporated into the bases of newly built houses to collect rainwater from the roofs. Shipping is hampered by the lack of an adequate anchorage. Satellite TV dishes are beginning to appear on some houses in the village.

Tokelau has one hotel, the Luana Liki Hotel, and one resort, Falefa Resort, both situated on Nukunonu.  Few tourists visit the country and tourism is not widely promoted.  There is ambivalence about tourism, with some Tokelauans wanting to keep the country unaffected by the outside world. Despite this, visitors are greeted with traditional Polynesian hospitality. The Luana Liki Hotel functions mainly to accommodate official visitors, which have included the New Zealand Prime Minister and Governor General.  There is one main shop in Nukunonu which sells a limited range of products.  Due to the vagaries of shipping schedules, it is at times short of goods.

Local administration consists of a Taupulega (Council of Elders), made up of heads of family groups and two elected members.  According to the 2006 census 426 people live on Nukunonu, of which more than 95% belong to the Catholic Church.

The most recent census data show of 2016 show the population at 448.

Environment

Important Bird Area
Some 60 ha of the eastern side of the atoll has been designated an Important Bird Area (IBA) by BirdLife International because the site supports breeding colonies of brown and black noddies and common white terns, with about 20,000 breeding pairs estimated in 2011.

Economy 
Coconut (Cocos nucifera) is an important food source here. The Black Rat (Rattus rattus) arrived with European exploration and can take 50% of the yield, but the native Polynesian Rat (R. exulans) will do the same amount of damage anywhere the Black Rat has not become dominant. Rodent control and research on rodent control are important to deal with the problem.

Islands

 Avakaukilikili  
 Matalapa
 Niualemu
 Hini Ailani
 Te Palaoa
 Apia  
 Haumagalu
 Niututahi  
 Lalohumu
 Olomoana
 Tuigaika
 Tima
 Vaivaimai
 Te Nonu
 Patiku
 Tuatiga
 Tagamako
 Hilakehe
 Na Taulaga
 Punalei  
 Motu Fala
 Motu Akea
 Fulumahaga
 Na Hapiti
 Fatigauhu  
 Te Afua o lafu
 Te Puka i Mua  
 Motuhaga  
 Te Kamu  
 Fakanava Tau Loto
 Vini
 Te Puka i Muli
 Te Fakanava

See also
List of Guano Island claims
List of islands of Tokelau

References

External links

 
Atolls of Tokelau
Pacific islands claimed under the Guano Islands Act
Territorial disputes of New Zealand
Populated places in Tokelau
Former disputed islands
Important Bird Areas of the Tokelau Islands
Important Bird Areas of the Realm of New Zealand
Seabird colonies